Por Amor (English: Anything For Love) is a Brazilian telenovela created by Manoel Carlos, starring Regina Duarte and Gabriela Duarte in the main roles. It replaced A Indomada and preceded Torre de Babel, and was the 55th telenovela to be aired by TV Globo.

Production

"What would you be able to do for love?" it was the motto of the advertising campaign for the release of the novel.

For the second time, Regina Duarte was a Helena de Manoel Carlos - the first out in História de Amor (Love History), in 1995. For the actress, even Por Amor would have been História de Amor 2 – because of the approach of the mother-daughter relationship. The actress's third Helena would come later, in Páginas da Vida (Pages of Life), in 2006. The name, used by the author in almost all of his novels since Baila Comigo (1981), has become a mark of style and gives unity to his work, creating a bond between the strong and charming "middle-class heroines" as he usually does. characterize their Helenas. Only in Sol de Verão (1982) did the author not include a Helena in his story.

Manoel Carlos tells that he wrote the synopsis of Por Amor in 1983, but, involved with other projects, postponed the plot. For this story, the author was inspired by the only love he believes to be absolutely unquestionable: the maternal.

The author says that he relied on common people and personal dramas to write the plots and characters of Por Amor. Orestes (Paulo José), for example, was born from a conversation with a friend of his. The two concluded that every family has an alcoholic, a former alcoholic or a potential alcoholic.

Director Paulo Ubiratan died during the novel on March 28, 1998. Ricardo Waddington, who already directed the plot, took over the general direction of Por Amor.

Plot
Helena is the divorced mother of Maria Eduarda, a spoiled young woman, and they both live in Leblon, where most of the story happens. Helena does her best to make Eduarda accept her alcoholic father, Orestes. But Eduarda has eyes only for her great love, Marcelo. The boy suffers from a persecution of his former girlfriend, Laura, distraught at having been neglected. Marcelo's mother, Branca Leticia, also disagreed with her son's choice. Branca is a fierce and strong-willed woman, who likes to manipulate other people. Branca worships Marcelo, her eldest son, but doesn't care for her other children, the modern middle daughter Milena and the shy youngest son, Leonardo. Branca controls the life of her friend Isabel, who has an affair with Atilio, a man who is looking for a great love. Branca has long been in love with Atilio and angry to learn that he fell in love with Eduarda's mother, Helena.

After a brief romance, and to Branca's disgust, as well as Isabel's and Laura's, Helena marries Atilio and Eduarda marries Marcelo. Mother and daughter get pregnant at the same time and give birth on the same day at the hospital in Rio de Janeiro, under the care of young doctor Cesar, a man who has always been in love with Eduarda. Helena's son is born healthy, but Eduarda has complications during the birth and the baby is stillborn. To complicate the situation of the younger woman, she can never be a mother due to the loss of her uterus. Helena can not bear the suffering this will bring to her daughter, and begs Cesar do help her. She proposes that they switch the babies, and Caesar is reluctant but accedes and agrees to the exchange. So Eduarda thinks her baby brother is her son, whom she named Marcelinho, and that it was her mother's baby who died. Cesar is the only person who knows this secret besides Helena. Helena, however, suffers with the secret, and must treat her baby as a grandchild, and sees her marriage to Atilio deteriorate, despite the great love that unites them.

To cope, she writes all the events in a diary, which is eventually discovered by Eduarda. In the midst of it all, Eduarda, having been so spoiled by her mother, refuses to help her father Orestes' alcoholism, and he is taken care of by his young daughter Sandra instead. Branca despises her daughter Milena's romantic involvement with Nando, Eduarda's stepbrother via Orestes, who is a helicopter pilot. Laura pursues Marcelo and poisons him against Eduarda, with Branca's support. It is ultimately discovered that Branca thought all along that Marcelo was Atilio's son, and that is why he was her favorite child; she was wrong, however, as her youngest son Leonardo is revealed to be Atilio's son, as he and Branca had an affair for many years. Marcelo and Milena are Arnaldo's children, Branca's womanizer husband, who has an affair with Isabel afterwards.

In the end, Atilio leaves, feeling betrayed after finding out the truth about his and Helena's baby. Laura, who gets pregnant by Marcelo, goes on a helicopter flight with Nando, and the two suffer an accident. Only Nando is found alive, and Marcelo and Eduarda reconcile, deciding to raise Laura's twins. Atilio ultimately comes back and gets back together with Helena. The last scene shows Marcelinho walking his first steps from Eduarda and Marcelo to Helena and Atilio, in the Rio de Janeiro Botanical Garden.

Cast

Reception

Ratings

References

External links
 
  entry on Teledramaturgia
  entry on Memória Globo

1997 telenovelas
1997 Brazilian television series debuts
1998 Brazilian television series endings
Brazilian telenovelas
Brazilian LGBT-related television shows
TV Globo telenovelas
Portuguese-language telenovelas
Alcohol abuse in television
Child abduction in television